The Vermont Progressive Party, formerly the Progressive Coalition, is a progressive political party in the United States founded in 1999 and active only in the state of Vermont. As of 2019, the party has two members in the Vermont Senate and five members in the Vermont House of Representatives, as well as several more affiliated legislators who caucus with the Democratic Party. After the Democratic and Republican parties, the Progressive Party has the highest number of seats in state and national offices for any organized political party in the country.

History

Formation in Burlington 
The Vermont Progressive Party originated in the early 1980s with the successful independent campaign of Bernie Sanders for mayor of Burlington (prior to being elected mayor Sanders was a leader in the Vermont Liberty Union Party). Sanders, who was later elected to the House of Representatives and subsequently to the Senate, and who co-founded the Congressional Progressive Caucus, never officially associated himself with the Progressive Party due to the fact it was only organized at the state level and not nationally, although the Progressives were among his biggest supporters. A group of Sanders's supporters, the "Progressive Coalition" as they had come to be known, as well as former members of the dissolved Citizens Party, organized themselves during his final term as mayor to contest future elections within the city as well as other parts of the state.

Progressive Peter A. Clavelle was elected Mayor of Burlington in 1989 and served seven terms. After winning his first term, he remained in office until 1993 when he lost his re-election bid after giving domestic partners of city employees full benefits. Clavelle returned to the mayor's office two years later in 1995, continuing to hold the position until 2006, when he was succeeded by Progressive State Representative Bob Kiss.

Expansion to state government 
The coalition succeeded in electing several members, including Terry Bouricius in 1990, to the Vermont General Assembly, and formally became the Progressive Party after establishing a stable political base following the 1998 elections. In the 2004 elections, the party picked up three new seats and then had five representatives in the Vermont House of Representatives.

By the 2012 elections the party had several members of the legislature and a candidate elected to statewide office, as well as dozens of local office holders around the state.

Election results

Platform 
The Progressive Party encompasses a progressive platform. The party's main focus has historically been advocacy for a single-payer health care system, which has recently made great strides with the implementation of Green Mountain Care, a health care program that was pushed by Democratic Governor Peter Shumlin due to pressure from the Progressive Party. Other major policy platforms are renewable energy programs and a phase-out of nuclear energy, public transportation proposals including one for a high-speed rail system, criminal justice reforms directed at reducing the state's prison population and better protecting convicts' rights, the creation of programs to end homelessness in the state, ending the War on Drugs and repealing No Child Left Behind and ending the focus on standardized testing in the school system. The party also has an anti-war stance, advocating for Vermont's national guard to be restricted from engaging in war zones outside the United States, an end to the wars in Iraq and Afghanistan and opposition to all preemptive wars, strikes, or other offensive or interventionist military actions. The party is very supportive of LGBT rights and members of the party were involved in the legalization of same-sex marriage in the state.

Economically, the party also calls for converting the minimum wage to a living wage and having it tied to inflation rates, having the economy focus on small and local businesses, empowerment of worker cooperatives and publicly owned companies as democratic alternatives to multi-national corporations and to decentralize the economy, for the strengthening of state law to protect the right to unionize, for implementing a progressive income tax and repealing the Capital Gains Tax Exemption and residential education property tax, and for all trade to be subject to international standards on human rights. The party is also critical of privatization.

Elected officials

State 
State-wide office
 David Zuckerman (P/D), Lieutenant Governor of Vermont (2017–2021); (2023–present)
 Doug Hoffer (D/P), Vermont Auditor of Accounts (2013–present)

Vermont Senate
 President pro tempore Tim Ashe (D/P), Chittenden, with 5 others (3 D, 1 D/P, 1 P/D) (2009–2021)
 Senator Philip Baruth (D/P) Chittenden with 5 others (3 D, 1 D/P, 1 P/D) (2011–present)
 Senator Cheryl Hooker (D/P) Rutland with 2 others (2 R) (2019–present)
 Senator Christopher Pearson (P/D), Chittenden, with 5 others (3 D, 2 D/P) (2017–present)
 Senator Andrew Perchlik (D/P), Washington, with 2 others (1 D, 1 P/D) (2019–present)
 Senator Anthony Pollina (P/D), Washington, with 2 others (1 D, 1 D/P) (2011–present)

Vermont House of Representatives
 Rep. Mollie Burke (P), Windham-3-2, single member district (2009–present)
 Rep. Robin Chesnut-Tangerman (P), Rutland-Bennington, single member district (2015–present)
 Rep. Brian Cina (P), Chittenden-6-4, with 1 (P) (2017–present)
 Rep. Selene Colburn (P), Chittenden-6-4, with 1 (P) (2017–present)
 Rep. Mari Cordes (D/P), Addison-4, with 1 (D) (2019–present)
 Rep. Diana Gonzalez (P), Chittenden-6-7, with 1 (D) (2015–present)
 Rep. Sandy Haas (P), Windsor-Rutland-2, single member district (2005–present)
 Rep. Zachariah Ralph (P), Windsor-1, with 1 (D) (2019–present)

County 
 Chittenden County
 Daniel L. Gamelin (D/P/R), High Bailiff (2011–present)
 Essex County
 Vincent Illuzzi (R/P/D/L), State's Attorney (1999–present)
 Trevor Colby (R/P), Sheriff (2011–present)
 Grand Isle County
 Ray C. Allen (D/P/R), Sheriff (2015–present)
 Windham County
 Alan Blood (P), Justice of the Peace, Putney, with 9 (8 D, 1 P) (2019–present)
 Edith Gould (P), Justice of the Peace, Putney, with 9 (8 D, 1 P) (2017–present)
 Caledonia County
 Christian Bradley Hubbs (P), Justice of the Peace, Burke, with 6 (2 R, 2 I, 2 D) (2019–present)

Municipal

City 
 Burlington
 City Council 
 Perri Freeman (Central District-Ward 2 & 3) (2019–present)
 Jack Hanson (East District-Ward 1 & 8) (2019–present)
 Zoraya Hightower (Ward 1) (2020–present)
 Max Tracy (Ward 2) (2012–present)
 Joe Magee (Ward 3) (2021–present)
 Ali Dieng (D/P) (Ward 7) (2017–present)
 Jane Stromberg (Ward 8) (2020–present)
 Ward Clerk 
 Wendy Coe (Ward 2) (2010–present)
 Ward Inspector 
 Jane Stromberg (Ward 1) (2019–present)
 Alex Rose (Ward 2) (2019–present)
 Kit Andrews (Ward 3) (2013–present)
 Bonnie Filker (Ward 3) (2019–present)
 Montpelier
 Mayor
 Anne Watson (2018–present)

Town 
 Springfield
 Selectboard
 Stephanie Thompson (2010–present)
 Fairlee
 Zoning and Planning Administrator
 John Christopher Brimmer (2012–present)
 Berlin
 Selectboard
 Jeremy Hansen (2013–present)
 Richmond
 Selectboard
 Steve May (2016–present)
 The party also has a significant number of its members elected to other local offices in town governments and appointed to serve as town officials. However, in Vermont these elections are non-partisan and no party name appears before their names on election ballots or during an appointment process.

Party leaders 
The current chair of the party's State Committee is State Senator and former Gubernatorial nominee and Congressional candidate Anthony Pollina, and the current vice-chair, Marielle Blais, was first elected in 2019. Secretary Chris Brimmer, also the Chair of the Caledonia County Committee, has served since 2009. The current Treasurer is Robert Millar, who briefly served as Acting Chair in 2001, and Assistant Treasurer Martha Abbott previously served as Treasurer and twice as chair. After being in the position of Acting Chair while the State Committee was not formalized, Heather Riemer served as the party's first chair at its formation as a statewide party in 1999. The position of executive director was added in 2011, and since 2015 has been the party's only paid staff, and has been occupied by Joshua Wronski. Current Treasurer Robert Millar previously served as executive director from 2011 to 2015.

 Chair: Anthony Pollina (2007–2009, 2017–present)
 Vice Chair: Marielle Blais (2019–present)
 Secretary: John Christopher Brimmer (2009–present)
 Treasurer: Robert Millar (2019–present)
 Assistant Treasurer: Martha Abbott (2019–present)
 Executive Director: Joshua Wronski (2015–present)
 Senate Caucus Leader: Anthony Pollina (2013–present)
 Senate Caucus Whip: Christopher Pearson (2017–present)
 House Caucus Leader: Robin Chesnut-Tangerman (2017–present)
 House Caucus Whip: Diana Gonzalez (2017–present)
 Youth/Student Caucus Leader: Carter Neubieser (2015–present)
 Coordinating Committee:
 Nick Clark
 Carter Neubieser
 Adam Norton
 Zachariah Ralph
 Tanya Vyhovsky
 Cindy Weed
 Regional Advisers (Non-voting):
 West-Central: Finnian Boardman Abbey
 East-Central: Traven Leyshon
 Northern: Jackie Stanton
 Southeast: Pamela Whitefield
 Southwest: Tim Guiles

Timeline of party Chairs

See also
Progressive Party (United States, 1912) (Bull Moose Party)
Progressive Party (United States, 1924–1934)
Progressive Party (United States, 1948)
California Progressive Party
Colorado Progressive Party
Oregon Progressive Party
Washington Progressive Party
Wisconsin Progressive Party
Minnesota Progressive Party
Louisiana Progressive Party
Australian Progressives
Green Party (United States)

Notes

References

External links

Article on the Vermont Progressive Party from The Progressive Populist

1999 establishments in Vermont
Democratic socialist parties in the United States
Vermont
Political parties established in 1999
Progressive Party
Progressive parties in the United States
Social democratic parties in the United States
Regional and state political parties in the United States
Political parties in the United States
State and local socialist parties in the United States